The 2017 Sun Belt Conference men's basketball tournament is the postseason conference tournament for the Sun Belt Conference. The tournament will be held at the  Lakefront Arena in New Orleans, Louisiana from March 8 to March 12, 2017. The tournament winner will receive the conference's automatic bid into the NCAA tournament.

Seeds
All 12 conference teams will compete in the conference tournament. Teams were seeded by record within the conference, with a tiebreaker system to seed teams with identical conference records. The top four teams received a bye to the quarterfinals.

Schedule

Bracket

See also
2017 Sun Belt Conference women's basketball tournament

References

External links
 2017 Sun Belt Men's Basketball Championship

Sun Belt Conference men's basketball tournament
Tournament
Sun Belt Conference men's basketball tournament
Sun Belt Conference men's basketball tournament